The Brass Rail is one of Toronto's downtown strip clubs. It is located on Yonge Street just south of Bloor. It is well known as a popular venue for celebrities, especially during the Toronto International Film Festival, which is based at the nearby luxury hotels of Yorkville. Stars that have been observed there include Samuel L. Jackson, Charlize Theron, Alex Rodriguez, and Colin Farrell. The Brass Rail was one of the first venues Paul Shaffer worked in, serving as host and musician.

The club has also been the site of a number of legal battles. It was the only club in Toronto to deliberately defy the city's bylaw against lap dancing. When federal laws also arrived banning lap dancing, it was one of a group of clubs that brought the issue all the way to the Supreme Court of Canada, which in the 1997 R v Mara case threw out the bans on lap dancing.

See also
 List of strip clubs

References

External links

Strip clubs in Canada
Nightclubs in Toronto